Cemetery Gates is a 2006 American horror film directed by Roy Knyrim and starring Reggie Bannister, Peter Stickles, and Aime Wolf. The film's plot concerns a genetically mutated Tasmanian devil that stalks a cemetery.

Plot

After breaking into a laboratory facility in order to free the animals kept there for experiments, two environmental activists unleash a genetically mutated Tasmanian devil from its cage. Fleeing from the facility, the creature begins hunting in a nearby cemetery, killing anyone and anything it comes across.

Cast

Production
Over ten years before Cemetery Gates was filmed, screenwriter Brian Patrick O'Toole, received a script for the film from Pat Coburn and J. Victor Renauld. O'Toole, who was working as a literary agent at the time, "loved" the idea of a Tasmanian devil as an antagonist, stating: "My feeling was, 'Why hasn't anybody thought of this before—a mutant Tasmanian devil?' It's the most pissed-off, vicious creature on the planet." O'Toole noted that a close childhood friend of his, Michael Beck, died one day before O'Toole received the script, and said that, "most importantly, this was a movie Michael and I would have loved."

Throughout the next decade, the script for Cemetery Gates went through a number of different drafts and storylines. The final draft of the script was written in four days over the Thanksgiving holiday in 2003. Filming took place over a period of 13 days; shooting locations included the Bronson Caves in Los Angeles, California.

Release

Home media
On May 30, 2006, Cemetery Gates was released on DVD by Kismet Entertainment, Graveyard Filmworks, and Ventura.

References

Bibliography

External links
 
 

2006 horror films
2006 films
American monster movies
2000s English-language films
2000s American films